i-Balita was the flagship news broadcast of Net 25 (DZEC-TV) in the Philippines. The show aired from August 13, 2007 to October 21, 2011 replacing Newsbeat and was replaced by Mata ng Agila. The program anchored by Onin Miranda and Elaine Fuentes. It aired live via satellite through 30-minute newscast, aired at 7:00 AM Philippine time and a 60-minute newscast, aired at 5:30 PM Philippine time. On August 11, 2008, it produced spin-offs in English was premiered as I-News and the first in Philippine news program aired in HDTV format through their sister station GEM-TV 49 (DZCE-TV) using ISDB-T digital television standard.

I-Balita was also the first to interview the three hostages of Abu Sayyaf for the first time since their capturing by the bandits (DZEC had also simulcasted this interview). It also covered the updates about Eraño G. Manalo's death and wake.

On January 17, 2011, there was also a news-related topic talk show airs after the last I-Balita at 5:30 PM. Called I-Balita Online, it aired every 6:30 PM and was anchored by Arlyn Dela Cruz. Also, the program was launched on January 22, 2011 as a weekly news program that aired every Saturday. It was known as I-Balita Weekend Report anchored by DZXL anchor Ely Saludar, it focused on news events happened in the last 5 days (Monday to Friday), and aired at 5:30 PM.

As of May 2, 2011, Onin Miranda and Elaine Fuentes became the new anchors of  I-Balita's primetime edition replacing Ivy Canlas and Joy Maico.

However, Maico would still anchor the morning and noontime edition along with Gel Miranda, replacing Ivy Canlas.

Anchors
Rossel Velasco-Taberna (2007–2008)
Ivy Canlas (2008–2011)
Joy Maico (2008–2011)
Eunice Mariño (2008–2011)
Amor Larrosa (2008–2011)
Gel Miranda (2011)
Mavic Trinidad (2011)
Onin Miranda (2011)
Elaine Fuentes (2011)
Ely Saludar (2011)

See also
List of programs previously broadcast by Net 25
i-News

Philippine television news shows
2007 Philippine television series debuts
2011 Philippine television series endings
Filipino-language television shows
Flagship evening news shows
Net 25 original programming